James J. Gould (September 1, 1823March 1, 1909) was a Michigan politician.

Early life
James J. Gould was born on September 1, 1823 in Hector, New York to parents Bethuel Vincent Gould and Deborah Gould. James received a public school education. In 1854, James moved to Reading Township, Michigan.

Career
In 1859, Gould served as the treasurer of Reading Township. In 1866, Gould moved to Kalamo Township, Michigan. In Kalamo, he worked as a farmer. In 1873, Gould served as justice of the peace in Kalamo alongside Joseph Gridley. On November 7, 1876, Gould was elected to the Michigan House of Representatives, where he represented the Eaton County 2nd district from January 3, 1877 to December 31, 1878.

Personal life
Gould was married to Adelia Fletcher. On February 28, 1890, Adelia died. In 1891, Gould remarried to Sarah J. Gridley. Sarah died on December 21, 1898.

Death
Gould died on March 1, 1909, in Kalamo. He is interred at Hillside Cemetery in Kalamo.

References

1823 births
1909 deaths
American justices of the peace
Burials in Michigan
City and town treasurers in the United States
Farmers from Michigan
Republican Party members of the Michigan House of Representatives
People from Tompkins County, New York
People from Eaton County, Michigan
People from Hillsdale County, Michigan
19th-century American judges
19th-century American politicians